Live in Tokyo is the third release, and first live album by Weather Report. Originally released by CBS/Sony in Japan only, it was not released in the US until a 2014 CD reissue by Wounded Bird Records. Recording took place on January 13, 1972, one of five sold-out concerts played in Japan during that January. I Sing the Body Electric (1972) contained several tracks that were edited for the studio album, but can be heard as they were performed, in their entirety, on this live album.

Track listing
Medley: "Vertical Invader" (Joe Zawinul) / "Seventh Arrow" (Miroslav Vitouš) / "T.H." (Vitouš) / "Doctor Honoris Causa" (Zawinul) – 26:14
Medley: "Surucucú" (Wayne Shorter) / "Lost" (Shorter) / "Early Minor" (Zawinul) / "Directions" (Zawinul) – 19:19
"Orange Lady" (Zawinul) – 18:14
Medley: "Eurydice" / "The Moors" (Shorter) – 13:49
Medley: "Tears" (Shorter) / "Umbrellas" (Shorter, Zawinul) – 10:54

Personnel 
Musicians
 Josef Zawinul – electric and acoustic piano
 Wayne Shorter – soprano and tenor saxophones
 Miroslav Vitouš – bass
 Eric Gravatt – drums
 Dom Um Romão – percussion

Production
 Kiyoshi Itoh – producer
 Susumu Satoh – engineer
 Eiko Ishioka – design
 Yoshio Nakanishi – design
 Tadayuki Naitoh – photography

References

External links 
 Weather Report - Live in Tokyo (1972) album releases & credits at Discogs
 Weather Report - Live in Tokyo (1972) album credits & user reviews at ProgArchives.com
 Weather Report - Live in Tokyo (1972) album to be listened on Spotify
 Weather Report - Live in Tokyo (1972) at www.WeatherReportDiscography.org

Weather Report albums
1972 live albums
Live jazz fusion albums
Columbia Records live albums